Dahira bruno is a moth of the family Sphingidae first described by Felix Bryk in 1944. It is known from Myanmar and possibly south-western China.

References

Dahira
Moths described in 1944